Daniel Varela Suanzes-Carpegna (born 1 April 1951 in Lugo) is a Spanish politician and former Member of the European Parliament with the People's Party, part of the European People's Party. He served in the European Parliament from 1994 to 2009.

During his last mandate, he was vice-chair of European Parliament's Committee on International Trade and of its Committee on Fisheries. He was also a substitute for the Committee on Regional Development and a member of the Delegation for relations with Australia and New Zealand.

Education
 1974: Graduate in law
 diploma in international studies
 1980: Diplomatic School
 1985: diploma in European Community studies
 1985: Traineeship in the Legal Service of the European Commission

Career
 1985–1993: Legal adviser to the Galician regional government
 1990–1992: Commissioner for Galicia at Expo-92
 1994–2009: Member of the European Parliament
 1999–2002: Chairman of the Committee on Fisheries
 2002–2004: Coordinator on fisheries for the EPP Group
 2002–2004: Coordinator on safety at sea for the EPP Group
 First Vice-Chairman of the Committee on International Trade

See also
 2004 European Parliament election in Spain

External links
 
 

1951 births
Living people
People's Party (Spain) MEPs
MEPs for Spain 1994–1999
MEPs for Spain 1999–2004
MEPs for Spain 2004–2009
Politicians from Galicia (Spain)
People from Galicia (Spain)